Nikolay Vasilyevich Surov (Russian: Николай Васильевич Суров; 20 May 1947 – 28 February 2010) was a Russian Olympic rower who competed at the 1968 Summer Olympics in Mexico City representing the Soviet Union. He died on 28 February 2010 at the age of 62.

References

Biography of Nikolay Surov 

1947 births
2010 deaths
Olympic rowers of the Soviet Union
Rowers at the 1968 Summer Olympics
Russian male rowers
European Rowing Championships medalists